Francesco Pesellino (probably 1422–July 29, 1457), also known as Francesco di Stefano, was an Italian Renaissance painter active in Florence. His father was the painter Stefano di Francesco (died 1427), and his maternal grandfather was the painter Giuliano Pesello (1367–1446), from whose name the diminutive nickname "Pesellino" arose. After the death of his father in 1427, the young Pesellino went to live with his grandfather whose pupil he became. Pesellino remained in his grandfather's studio until the latter's death, when he began to form working partnerships with other artists, such as Zanobi Strozzi and Fra Filippo Lippi. He married in 1442, and probably joined the Florentine painters' guild in 1447. In the following years he made for reputation with small, highly-finished works for domestic interiors, including religious panels for private devotional use and secular subjects for pieces of furniture (i.e. wedding chests and wainscoting).

Pesellino died of plague in Florence in 1457 at the age of 35. According to many art historians, his style "anticipated the developments of later Florentine painters such as Andrea del Verrocchio and the Pollaiuoli [the brothers Antonio and Piero]".

Works
According to Vasari, Pesellino painted the predella of Fra Filippo Lippi's Novitiate Altarpiece for Santa Croce. The predella is now divided between the Uffizi and the Louvre.

Pesellino's only surviving documented work is the altarpiece of the Trinity, commissioned in 1455 by the Confraternity of the Priests in Pistoia and now at the National Gallery in London. It was left incomplete on Pesellino's death in 1457 and was finished in 1460 by Filippo Lippi and his workshop, which painted the predella and altar frontal. The main panel, which is about 1.8 meters square, shows the Trinity as the "Throne of Mercy," with God the Father supporting the Crucified Christ in his lap. The Trinity is flanked by four standing saints: Mamas, James, Zeno and Jerome. The altarpiece retains four of its original predella panels while the remaining fifth is now at the Hermitage, St Petersburg. The altar frontal, depicting the Virgin of Mercy, was formerly at the Gemäldegalerie, Berlin, and was destroyed in 1945. 
The commission is unusually well documented. The documents provide a detailed account of the commissioning process and the painting's completion and delivery. They also tell how on Pesellino's death in 1457, his widow began litigation against Pesellino's business partner over the cost of the unfinished work. A number of preparatory drawings for the painting also survive. The altarpiece was later cut up into six parts, probably in the eighteenth century, and has now been reassembled. One missing section (the lower right) is a modern reconstruction.

Early sources, such as Vasari's Lives of the Artists, describe a number of other paintings by Pesellino, now lost, in prominent at the Palazzo Medici and the Medici Casa Vecchia. At least one work by Pesellino is said to have hung in the same room as Paolo Uccello's Battle of San Romano.

Some panel paintings have been identified as Pesellino's by stylistic comparison with the altarpiece. These include two long horizontal panels with the Story of David and Goliath and the Triumph of David, now at the National Gallery, London. Other cassoni panels are in Bergamo (Accademia Carrara) and Boston (Isabella Stewart Gardner Museum), whilst the Metropolitan Museum of Art and Toledo Museum of Art have other works. A small diptych of the Annunciation at the Courtauld Institute is another good example of the small-scale cabinet paintings that made Pesellino's famous.

The Hermitage has six very beautiful full-page miniatures by Pesellino from an illuminated manuscript.

Notes

References 
National Gallery Catalogues (new series): The Fifteenth Century Italian Paintings, Volume 1, by Dillian Gordon, 2003, 
 Vasari, Giorgio, Le Vite delle più eccellenti pittori, scultori, ed architettori, many editions and translations.
Sheridan, Victoria,  Inventing Pesellino:  Biography, Language and Style in Art History, M.A. Thesis (2003), University of California, Davis.  OCLC#55762857
Kanter, Laurence. "Pesellino," in Fra Angelico. New York: Metropolitan Museum of Art, 2005.

External links

National Gallery
Boston cassoni panels
Artcyclopedia links
Pesellino at the National Gallery of Art
Italian Paintings: Florentine School, a collection catalog containing information about Pesellino and his works (see Pesellino, pages: 95-98).

1422 births
1457 deaths
15th-century Italian painters
Quattrocento painters
Italian male painters
Italian Renaissance painters
Painters from Florence
Manuscript illuminators
Catholic painters